The Diyala governorate election of 2009 was held on 31 January 2009 alongside elections for all other governorates outside Iraqi Kurdistan and Kirkuk.

Campaign 

A Sunni Arab candidate from the National Reform Trend was killed near the disputed town of Mandali.

Results 

Immediately after the election, the Iraqi National List and the Iraqi National Dialogue Front claimed victory in Diyala. The final results saw them both winning seats, but no part having an overall majority.

A month after the vote, 2000 supporters of ISCI protested at the results, saying internally displaced refugee supporters had been unable to vote, and a large number of their supporters had turned up to vote to find their names were not on the electoral roll.

In March, the INDF said they would form an alliance with the State of Law Coalition and the Iraqi Islamic Party allied with the Islamic Supreme Council of Iraq.

References 

2009 Iraqi governorate elections